Peter Neptune  (born July 10, 1956) is an American wine expert and educator as well as a former television and NY stage actor.  He is one of only 147 Master Sommeliers in North America, as of June 2015, and is the founder of the Orange County, CA-based Neptune School of Wine.  He appeared on and off Broadway in 1984 and 1985, appeared in numerous television movies and series from 1988 through 1990, and appeared as himself in the 2013 wine documentary SOMM.

Life and career 
Neptune was born in Newport Beach, California, on July 10, 1956.  He started learning about wine and food while working at a Laguna Beach, CA restaurant called Tivoli Terrace, owned by his stepmother June.

Acting career
In 1979, Neptune moved to New York City to become a theater actor.  He studied acting with Wynn Handman at The American Place Theatre. He was a featured actor in playwright Cynthia Heimel's play A Girl's Guide to Chaos, and also originated the role of Jeff Barry in the 1984 Off-Broadway production of Leader of the Pack, appearing in the 1985 Broadway production as well.

He also appeared in a variety of television productions.  He filmed a number of programs in NY and also commuted back to L.A.  His roles included the television action film C.A.T. Squad: Python Wolf (1988) and the television biopic Rock Hudson (1990) as well as guest appearances in television series such as L.A. Law (1988), Tour of Duty (1988), Hardball (1989) and Life Goes On (1989).  He also made a guest appearance as Crewman Aron on Star Trek: The Next Generation, in the second season episode "The Dauphin" (1989).

While pursuing acting opportunities, he supplanted his income by working in restaurants.  He convinced the manager of a high-end restaurant to allow him to manage the wine program, even though he had relatively little experience with wine.

In 1989, after ten years working in various productions while also working as a sommelier in restaurants, he returned to Orange County, California.  Soon after moving back, he was up for a leading role in a television series, but when he didn't get the part after multiple callbacks, he decided to forgo his acting career and devote himself full-time to wine.

Wine sales and education
In the mid-'90s, starting out as a wine salesman, he became more educated about wine, and realized that he could be as good if not better than many of the experts.  He traveled to New York to take his first wine exam, and, after failing, studied intently and eventually passed.  He joined Benicia, CA-based Henry Wine Group and eventually became their Senior Vice President of Corporate Training, training and educating fellow employees as well as retail customers about wine.

Neptune School of Wine
In 2003, Neptune launched the Neptune School of Wine, the first school in Southern California dedicated to teaching the wine curriculum established by London-based Wine & Spirit Education Trust (WSET), considered the world's foremost wine education group.  The school administers WSET wine education programs, as well as the French Wine Scholar program and exam offered by the Washington, D.C.-based French Wine Society.

Master Sommelier
In 2005, Neptune passed the notoriously difficult Master Sommelier exam, becoming one of 229 certified Master Sommeliers worldwide, as of June 2015.  He was the first person in decades to pass the exam while living in Southern California.  As of June 2015, he was one of the teaching Masters at the Court of Master Sommelier Intro and Advanced Courses, and was an examiner at the Certified, Advanced, and Master Sommelier Examinations.

SOMM
It was through Neptune's participation as a Master Sommelier examiner that he met director Jason Wise, who with Neptune's help was given permission to film part of the Master Sommelier examination for SOMM, a 2013 documentary following four candidates through the process.  Wise featured Neptune in the documentary, playing himself, along with fellow Master Sommeliers Michael Jordan, Fred Dame and Geoff Kruth.  Neptune was recognized for the passion and enthusiasm he showed for wine while giving his filmed interviews.

Additional wine credentials
In addition to his Master Sommelier Diploma, Neptune holds the title of Certified Wine Educator (CWE) with the Society of Wine Educators, has a diploma in Wine and Spirits from the London-based Wine & Spirit Education Trust (WSET), is recognized as an Associate of the Institute of Wines and Spirits (AIWS), a title bestowed upon wine experts who complete WSET's diploma, and holds the credential French Wine Scholar, with Highest Honors.

Wine consulting
As a certified Master Sommelier, Neptune acts as a wine program consultant for a variety of hotels and restaurants nationwide, including Fairmont Hotels and Resorts' properties the Fairmont San Francisco and the Plaza Hotel in Manhattan, as well as the Terranea Resort in Rancho Palos Verdes, CA, and the restaurant One Pico at the Shutters Hotel in Santa Monica, CA, where Los Angeles Times restaurant critic S. Irene Virbila noted that the "user-friendly list from Master Sommelier Peter Neptune is very fairly priced for a hotel restaurant."  Neptune's wine list at One Pico has won Wine Spectator's 2014 Award of Excellence every year since 2009.

References

External links
 Peter Neptune School of Wine
 

1956 births
Sommeliers
Living people
People from Newport Beach, California